Bahriye Üçok (1919 – October 6, 1990) was a Turkish academic of theology, left-wing politician, writer, columnist, and women's rights activist whose assassination in 1990 remains unresolved.

Early life and education
Born in Trabzon, Bahriye Üçok finished her primary education in Ordu and then graduated from Kandilli High School for Girls in Istanbul. She was educated in Medieval Islamic and Turkish History at the Faculty of Philology, History and Geography of Ankara University. At the same time, she attended the State Conservatory and completed the Opera section.

Professional career 
After eleven years working as a high school teacher in Samsun and Ankara, she entered 1953 Ankara University as an assistant in the Faculty of Theology. She obtained her PhD in 1957, and became 1965 an associate professor with her thesis on "Female rulers in Islamic countries". She subsequently became a professor, being the ever first female university teacher in this faculty. She was fluent in Arabic and Persian, and interpreted Islam in a modern and tolerant way focusing on the role of women in Islam.

Political career 
In 1971, she was elected contingency senator by President Cevdet Sunay, and so her political career started. In 1977 Üçok joined the center-left Republican People's Party (Turkish: Cumhuriyet Halk Partisi, CHP). After the military coup in 1980, she co-founded the People's Party (Turkish: Halkçı Parti) and was elected deputy of Ordu into the Grand National Assembly of Turkey in 1984. In 1985, after a merger (with SODEP), her party was renamed the Social Democratic People's Party (SHP).

Death
She also wrote an opinion column in the newspaper Cumhuriyet. After a TV forum, at which she declared that covered dressing in Islam (Hijab) is not obligatory, Bahriye Üçok received increasing threats from the militant organization "Islamic Movement". Not long after, on October 6, 1990, she was killed by a mail bomb as she was trying to open a book package in front of her house. The assassination remained unsolved. She was laid to rest at the Karşıyaka Cemetery in Ankara.

Aftermath
Gülay Calap, known as the "parcel-girl" who had accepted the packet for delivery, disappeared for a long period after the assassination. On January 16, 1994 she was arrested in İzmir as the İzmir responsible of the Revolutionary People's Party, an organization that is aligned with the PKK. The court sentenced her to prison for 22 years and 6 months, of which she served 12 years. Calap joined the Democratic Society Party (DTP) in 2007, and became its vice president in November of that year.

Selected works
 İslâm'dan Dönenler ve İlk Yalancı Peygamber (Renegers in Islam and the First Fake Prophet) (1967) Ankara
 İslâm Devletinde Kadın Hükümdarlar (Female Rulers in Islamic Countries)
 İslam Tarihi (History of Islam)
 Islam Tarihinde Emeviler - Abbasiler (Umayyads - Abbasids in the History of Islam)
 Atatürk'ün İzinde Bir Arpa Boyu (A Tiny Step in the Footsteps of Atatürk) 270p, (1985), Cem Publishing, Istanbul 
 Aly Mazahéri, Ortaçağda Müslümanların Günlük Yaşayışları (translation) (Daily Life of Muslims in the Middle Age)

See also
 List of assassinated people from Turkey
 List of unsolved murders
 Women in Turkish politics

References

External links
 Prof. Dr. Bahriye ÜÇOK, Atatürkçü Düşünce Derneği 
 Who is who 

1919 births
1990 deaths
Ankara University alumni
Academic staff of Ankara University
Assassinated Turkish journalists
Burials at Karşıyaka Cemetery, Ankara
Cumhuriyet people
Deputies of Ordu
Deaths by letter bomb
Female murder victims
Murdered Cumhuriyet columnists
People from Trabzon
Republican People's Party (Turkey) politicians
Terrorism deaths in Turkey
Turkish activists
Turkish sociologists
Turkish terrorism victims
Turkish women historians
People killed by Islamic terrorism
People murdered in Turkey
Populist Party (Turkey) politicians
Social Democracy Party (Turkey) politicians
Social Democratic Populist Party (Turkey) politicians
Turkish women academics
Turkish women activists
Turkish women journalists
Unsolved murders in Turkey
Victims of Islamic terrorism
1990 murders in Turkey
20th-century Turkish politicians
20th-century Turkish writers
20th-century Turkish historians
20th-century Turkish women writers
20th-century Turkish women politicians